John "Jack" Dowling (August 6, 1890 – October 24, 1931) was an American professional golfer. He had two top-10 finishes in major championships: a tie for seventh in the 1912 U.S. Open and a quarterfinal loss (tie for fifth) in the inaugural 1916 PGA Championship. He won the 1921 Westchester Open and finished third in the same event in 1920.

He died suddenly of a massive heart attack in 1931 at the age of 41, cutting short a promising life and career.

Early life
Dowling was born August 6, 1890 in Glen Cove, New York. He served as the assistant professional at Nassau Country Club in 1910 and was later the head professional at Scarsdale Golf Club in Hartsdale, New York, before moving on to Engineers Country Club in Roslyn, New York.

Golf career
He grew up to be a small, wiry man who weighed only 118 pounds. In 1931, his golf swing was described by writer Ralph Trost of the Brooklyn Daily Eagle as "vivid ... it was a full, powerful, complete lash at the ball". Trost further elaborated on Dowling's appearance as being "thin as the proverbial rail and almost gaunt-looking".

1911 Eastern PGA Four-Ball Tournament
In the Eastern Professional Golfers Association Four-Ball Tournament held at Rumson Country Club, Rumson, New Jersey, on August 9, 1911, Dowling was paired with Jack Hobens. They won the event easily by posting a round of 68 and beat the second place team of Jack Jolly and Tom Anderson, Jr. who carded a round of 74. The winners received a gold medal and $125 in prize money.

1912 U.S. Open
The 1912 U.S. Open was the 18th U.S. Open, held August 1–2 at the Country Club of Buffalo in Amherst, New York, a suburb east of Buffalo. The course is now Grover Cleveland Golf Course, owned by Erie County. The Country Club of Buffalo relocated several miles east in 1926 to Williamsville. 20-year-old John McDermott successfully defended his U.S. Open title, two strokes ahead of runner-up Tom McNamara. Dowling carded rounds of 76-79-76-74=305, finished tied for seventh place, and won $45.

1916 PGA Championship
The 1916 PGA Championship was the first PGA Championship and is now considered to be one of golf's major championships. It was played from October 10–14 at the Siwanoy Country Club in Bronxville, New York, just north of New York City. Dowling opened play in the tournament with a first round bye.  In round two he defeated Emmett French 1 up on the first hole of a playoff (37th hole) but lost in the third round (quarterfinals) to Willie MacFarlane in a stubbornly contested match by the close score of 2 and 1.

Dowling had managed to gain entry into the tournament when a west coast player defaulted.  To fill the open spot, the PGA held a playoff between Dowling and Clarence Hackney, the result of which was 72-75=147 for Dowling and a 165 total for Hackney. Macdonald Smith was to have been the third player competing for the open spot but he showed up late after the other two players had finished and was disqualified.

Red Cross four-ball match
Dowling, who was paired with Tom McNamara in a match held on September 15, 1918 at Scarsdale Golf Club, defeated Chick Evans (national amateur and open champion), and Bobby Jones, in an American Red Cross four-ball match by the score of 1 up. The proceeds from the match were donated to the Red Cross for its war-time efforts during World War I. Dowling took full advantage in winning the match since the event was contested on his home course.

Death
On October 24, 1931, he played 36 holes of golf at Engineers Country Club in Roslyn, New York. After the two rounds were concluded, he went to his mother's house in nearby Glen Cove, New York, where he suffered an acute heart attack and died at age 41. The bus he was riding in after leaving the golf course had struck and killed a 7-year-old boy.

Professional wins

PGA Tour wins (1)
1921 Westchester Open

Other wins (1)
1911 Eastern PGA Four-Ball Tournament

Results in major championships

Note: Dowling played only in the U.S. Open and PGA Championship.

NYF = Tournament not yet founded
NT = No tournament
DNP = Did not play

R64, R32, R16, QF, SF = Round in which player lost in PGA Championship match play
"T" Indicates a tie for a place
Yellow background for top-10

References

American male golfers
PGA Tour golfers
Sportspeople from Glen Cove, New York
1890 births
1931 deaths